The House at 364 Cedar Avenue was a historic farmhouse at 364 Cedar Avenue in Long Branch, New Jersey, United States.
It was added to the National Register of Historic Places on November 1, 1979. 
The house was demolished .

History
The house was built on what was once a large farm covering over 100 acres, named the West Farm after John West. On April 4, 1862, Frederick Behr purchased a small plot of this farm and may have built the house around that time. Behr was a German immigrant and raised flowers. After his death in 1902, the property was divided among his daughters. One part later became the carriage house and stables for the Murry Guggenheim House.

See also
 Lauren K. Woods Theatre

References

National Register of Historic Places in Monmouth County, New Jersey
Greek Revival houses in New Jersey
Houses completed in 1862
Long Branch, New Jersey
New Jersey Register of Historic Places
1862 establishments in New Jersey